Baripada is a city and a municipality in Mayurbhanj district in the state of Odisha, India. Located along the east bank of the Budhabalanga river, Baripada is the cultural centre of north Odisha. In recent years, it has emerged as an educational hub with the opening of numerous professional colleges.

The city is the headquarters of Mayurbhanj district, Odisha's largest district by area. It houses the office of the District collector, the Superintendent of Police and the Court of the District and Sessions Judge. It lends its name to the Baripada Vidhan Sabha constituency of the Odisha state legislative assembly.

History

Originally the capital of the Mayurbhanj State, Baripada's antiquity is unknown. It was first recorded as Burpuddah by Major James Rennell of the East India Company in his famous Atlas of 1779. Baripada was established as headquarter of the state (now district) in the end of 18th century during the period of Sumitra Devi's ruling, which was earlier in Haripur. However, there was a proposed headquarter in the middle of Baripada and Kaptipada subdivision, which is now know as Puruna Baripada ( Old Baripada) after the headquarter Khiching and Haripur. The origins of the name are doubtful but it appears to be derived from the Bauri tribe that originally inhabited this area.

The ruins of an old mud fort in the centre of the town have completely disappeared. A temple dedicated to Ambika Devi is the sole survivor. The chief shrine of the town is a Jagannath temple dating from 1575 AD. It is also the oldest structure in the area. A statue of the Buddhist deity Lokeshvara housed in one of its rooms is even older. However, Baripada developed into a town only under the rule of Maharaja Jadunatha Bhanja who died in 1863. His successors, especially Maharaja Sriram Chandra Bhanj Deo, added many other public buildings to the town. Baripada was linked to Rupsa in Balasore district through a narrow gauge line known as the Mayurbhanj State Railway in the first decade of the 20th century. This provided a major impetus to trade and commerce.

The town continued to grow after the merger of Mayurbhanj State with the Union of India in 1949. In contrast to the planned nature of the town centre, the newer areas have tended to adopt a sprawling nature.

Geography

It has an average elevation of 36 metres (118 feet). The city lies along the Budhabalanga River.

Demographics

As of the 2011 Census of India, Baripada had a population of 110,058 of which 57,008 were males and 53,050 were females and the urban agglomeration had a population of 116,874, with 60,535 males and 56,339 females. The municipality had a sex ratio of 931 females per 1,000 males and 9% of the population were under six years old. Effective literacy was 89.31%; male literacy was 93.45% and female literacy was 84.88%.

Population
The population of Baripada has Odias, mainly Brahmins and Kshatriyas. The rest of the population includes Bengalis, Biharis, Marwaris, Punjabis and other north Indians. Religious groups like Muslims and Christians constitute a minor part of the population. The nearby villages have a major number of tribal population including Santhals and Hos.

As per provisional reports of Census India, population of Baripada in 2011 is 110,058 — of which male and female are 57,008 and 53,050 respectively. Although Baripada city has population of 110,058; its urban/metropolitan population is 116,874 of which 60,535 are males and 56,339 female.

Literacy rate 2011
In education section, total literates in Baripada city are 89,421 of which 48,388 are males while 41,033 are females. Average literacy rate of Baripada city is 89.31 percent of which male and female literacy was 93.45 and 84.88.

Child population 2011
Total children (0-6) in Baripada city are 9,933 as per figure from Census India report on 2011. There were 5,228 boys while 4,705 are girls. The child forms 9.03% of total population of Baripada City.

Sex ratio 2011
The sex ratio of Baripada city is 931 female per 1000 males. Child sex ratio of girls is 900 per 1000 boys.

Politics
Current MLA from Baripada Assembly Constituency is Prakash Soren of BJP, who won the seat in State elections of 2019. Previous MLAs from this seat were
2019: Prakash Soren (BJP)
2014: Sananda Marndi (BJD)
2009: Sananda Marndi (BJD)
2004: Bimal Lochan Das (JMM)
2000: Kishore Das (JMM)
1995: Prasanna Kumar Das (Congress)
1990: Chhatish Chandra Dhal (Janata Dal)
1985: Prasanna Kumar Das (Congress)
1980: Prasanna Kumar Das (Congress)
1977: Prasanna Kumar Das (Congress)
1974: Pramod Chandra Bhanjadeo (Independent)
1971: Pramod Chandra Bhanjadeo (Independent)
1967: Santosh Kumar Sahu (Congress)
1961: Santosh Kumar Sahu (Congress)
1957: Harihar Mohanty (PSP) and Samal Majhi (Independent)
1951: Girish Chandra Ray (PSP) and Surendra Singh (Congress)

Baripada is part of Mayurbhanj (Lok Sabha constituency). The current MP of Lok Sabha (2019) is Biseswar Tudu of Bharatiya Janata Party. From 2009 election year, Baripada constituency is reserved for Scheduled Tribes.

Economics
Baripada is home to many forest-based products such as timber, but due to heavy deforestation the sawmills were banned within a 25 km radius. Baripada is known for Sabai grass plantations, an African grass introduced to Baripada and was first planted in Hamilton Garden that grows on red volcanic soil and has strong fibres that are used for rope making known as Bubei. It has many cashew plantation fields. Khali (plates) and Duna (bowls) making, from leaves of Sal tree leaves (Shorea robusta), is another business that local men engage in.

It has many brick kilns on the banks of river Budhabalaga, which is the only perennial river flowing through the city. Timber remains one of the major sources of income for the local populace.

Culture
Baripada is popular for its art and culture. Many famous stars of Ollywood (Oriya film industry) are from Baripada. Baripada is famous for the Chhau dance form, famous all over the world. The Chaitra Parva celebrated in mid-April recognizes the local talents. Uttarsahi and Dakshinsahi are two main groups who perform in this festival with many other participants. Jhumar Song is popular in Baripada.

Baripada is the second place, after Puri, where the tradition of Ratha Yatra (Car festival of Lord Jagannath) began. Hence Baripada is called 'Dwitiya Srikhetra' (second Puri). Baripada's Ratha Yatra is popular for its unique tradition of allowing only women to pull the chariot of Goddess Subhadra.

Maa Ambika Temple is one of the chief temples and Maa Ambika is a highly revered deity in this region. It is in Badabazar, 1 km from Baripada bus stand.

Jagadhatri Mela at Bhanjpur is another big mela. It is the festival of Maa Jagadhatri, Goddess of the whole world. There is a 10–15 days mela known as mini Bali Jatra (named after Cuttack's Bali Jatra) which takes place at Jagadhatri Mela grounds, near the Bhanjpur railway Station during October–November. It is celebrated on Gosthastami. The Durga Puja in Baripada is also very popular in Baripada

Tourist spots

Khiching
Khiching is an ancient village under Sukruli block. Khiching is located about 50 km east of Keonjhargarh city  24 km west of Karanjia. The major festival in Khiching is Sivarathri, which is celebrated over seven days. The major tourist attraction of Khiching is the Maa Kichakeswari Temple. The temple was constructed during the year 920 925. Goddess Kichakeshwari was the ishtadevata and kuladevi of Bhanj dynasty as well as the deity of the Mayurbhanj princely state. The temple suffered in the hand of vandals. King of Mayurbhanj, Maharaja Pratap Chandra Bhanjdeo reconstructed the temple in the year 1934. There is a museum constructed by Maharaja Purna Chandra Bhanjdeo in the year 1922.

Debakunda

Debakunda is a waterfall and tank. The Ambika temple is on the hilltop near the falls. Debakunda is at a distance of 60 km from Baripada and 85 km from Balasore.

Similipal

Similipal National Park is an elephant and tiger reserve 30 km from Baripada. It has an evergreen forest having varied flora and fauna, served with a network of perennial streams. This is a habitat for tropical birds and animals like elephants, tigers, leopards, sambar, and deer. The landscape comprises Sal forests, grasslands, peaks and waterfalls.

Similipal is the richest watershed in Odisha, giving rise to many perennial rivers. The Budhabalanga, the Khadkei, the West Deo, the East Deo, the Salandi and the Sanjo are the major ones. Barehipani (400 m) and Joranda (150 m) waterfalls are visitor attractions, and the Ramtirtha Crocodile Rearing Centre is located in nearby Jashipur.

Baldiha Dam
Government neglect has taken its toll on century-old Baldiha Dam in Shamakhunta block of Mayurbhanj district. Built on river Palpala over 205 km2 area, the irrigation project remains defunct for the last 20 years due to lack of renovation. The Project was undertaken during the rule of Maharaja Shri Ramchandra Bhanjdeo and the then State Engineer Jarnold Martin Loe had constructed the dam at Baldiha,  from Baripada town.

As of 2019, 10 to 15 acres of land are being irrigated during Rabi season with the water from the dam while there is no irrigation for Kharif crop. The water level of the dam has drastically come down due to huge deposition of soil and leakages. Even water from Palpala river has failed to recharge the dam during rainy season.

Bhimkund
There is a sacred pool near the river Vaitarani. As per legend Bhima, the second Pandava, took his bath in this pool when the Pandavas were passing their incognito life in Birat Nagar (presumed to be the present location of Kaptipada). The Vaitarani river flows through a gorge in steps and flows down to the Bhimkund pool. During the Makar festival during January, thousands of people gather here to take a holy dip.

Manatri
It is best known for the shrine of 'Kakharua Baidyanath' (Temple of Lord Shiva). It is surrounded on three sides by water channels from the Gangahar River. The temple is based on the Odisha's temple architecture. During the Shivaratri festival thousands of devotees gather there. According to legend, the king of Somavanshi dynasty was affected by leucoderma and his whole body resembled with white patches like in a water melon ('kakharu' in Oriya). It is believed that he was cured by the grace of the deity. Some Odia inscriptions of Mayurbhanj royal family are seen on the temple walls.

To the west of temple in about 1 km are the remains of an ancient fort and 8 km to the east are the ruins of Kuradiha Gada.

Machha Kandana
Near Udala. Way to Podadiha village.

Kalo Dam

Situated in Nudadiha block.

Sunei Dam

10 km distance from Kaptipada, Mayurbhanj.

Haripur

Haripur, earlier known as Hariharpur, was founded by Maharaja Harihar Bhanj in 1400 CE and remained as the capital of Bhanja Dynasty before it shifted to Baripada. Baidyanath Bhaanj, another ruler of the dynasty built a magnificent brick temple in honour of his tutelary God Rasika-raya. Though currently dilapidated, it is unique among the brick temples of Orissa. Towards the north to the courtyard of Rasikaraya temple lies the ruins of Ranihanspur (the inner apartment of the queen).

Radhamohan temple is a brick-built rectangular temple nearby.

Lulung
This place is surrounded on three sides by hills of Similipal range. It is a popular place for picnicking, and tourists can purchase the stone utensils that are native to this place.

Devagram
Also known as Deogan, the river Sono flows close to the village. There are several ruins of old temples on the bank of the river. It is presumed that a change in the course of the river might have caused this destruction. The images of Ganesh and Parvati with Shiva Lingam and the eight-armed Chamunda on a heap of stone are found here. The sculpture of the Goddess and the pedestal are notable for their workmanship. Fragments of stone supposed to be parts of the ruins of Chamunda temple are still lying in the river bed.

Samibruksha
Samibruksha is a peak in the hillock and is about 500 ft high. There are five caves on the western side. Legend has it that the five Pandavas hid their arms in these caves before proceeding to the court of the king Virata. The pilgrims take their sacred bath in the nearby stream on Baruni day in the month of Chaitra. Makar Sankranti, which falls in mid-January, is the most important festival of this place.

Simla
Simla on the banks of river Burhabalanga is houses the shrine of Simileswar Shiva. Hundreds of pilgrims visit the shrine every day, and this place is famous with picnickers. A fair is held during the Shivaratri day which continues for a week.

Kuchei
This is an excavated prehistoric site and discoveries pertaining to Neolithic possessions of man are being made. The pottery fragments found with Neolithic implements speak of settlements in the late Stone Age in Mayurbhanj district.

Kuliana
Many paleolithic artifacts are being discovered in this region. Its very near to West Bengal's Medinipore.

Sitakund Waterfall
The Sitakund waterfall is one of the another outside attraction tourist place of Simlipal Tiger reserve of Odisha. The Sitakund waterfall is located at Mayurbhanj district of Odisha and it is the part of the Simlipal National Park. Also this place is the place of Hinduism because the name of the waterfall is Sitakund that is the name of Hindu goddess Sita Devi.

Transportation
Baripada railway station was one of the earliest stations in Odisha. The ruler of Mayurbhanj, Maharaja Krushna Chandra Bhanjdeo, connected Baripada to the Howrah-Chennai railway corridor by a narrow-gauge rail network, then known as the Mayurbhanj State Railway. The first ever airport during the British Raj in Odisha stands to this date at sites of Rajabasa (16 km from city) and Rasgovindpur (60 km from the city) with their 2 km-long runways which were constructed during World War II.

Now a broad gauge railway line has replaced it which has benefited over 150,000 of this city's population. As of now, a Baripada — Rupsa — Balasore DEMU Pgr. train and a superfast express train to the state capital Bhubaneswar runs on daily basis. There's also a weekly train that runs from Baripada to Puri directly. A new train to Kolkata from Baripada has been running since 2010. The city has also a suburban railway station at Bhanjpur named Bhanjpur railway station.

Regarding road transport, luxury A/C buses are a popular means of transportation between the cities. There is connectivity to Bhubaneswar, Puri, Sambalpur, Jharsuguda, Rourkela, Keonjhar, Balasore, Angul, Bolangir, Bhadrak, Cuttack, Jamshedpur, Kharagpur, Ranchi and Kolkata from here. The city is 3 km from the starting point of N.H. 5 (now N.H. 18) which goes to Chennai. There are a wide range of taxis for sightseeing and tours.

Education
Baripada  is the seat for North Orissa University at Takatpur. It is home to the Maharaja Purna Chandra Junior College which provides higher secondary education in Humanities, Science, and Commerce stream to more than 2000 students. It is also home to the MPC Autonomous College which provides graduate, and postgraduate level academics in various disciplines. The erstwhile Mayurbhanj Palace houses the Maharaja Purna Chandra Junior College with and Government Women's College with about 500 students.

The newly built Pandit Raghunath Murmu Medical College and Hospital started its classes from September 2017. It is located in Rangmatia, 8 km from the main town.

The oldest high school is M.K.C High School, built during 1889. The town has two Kendriya Vidyalaya schools. There are English medium schools, viz — St. Anne's Convent School, St. Mary's Convent School, Sacred Sunshine Secondary School, Sri Satya Sai Vidya Vihar, etc. The other schools are Maharishi Public School, Sarat Chandra Vidyapitha, Policeline High School, Bhanjpur High School, Bhanjpur Girls' High School, Rakhal Gope High School, Rakhal Gope Nodal School. One of the other schools include Maharani Premakumari Girls High school at Lalbazar for girls' secondary education.

The engineering college named Seemanta Engineering College, affiliated to BPUT is near Jharpokharia which is 35 km from Baripada. Mayurbhanj Law College (established in 1978), B.Ed. College, Ayurvedic College and Homeopathy colleges are in Baripada.

Diganta Vikas Residential School Baripada is situated in w.no 21 BijayramchandraPur.

Schools

The following are the noted schools in the city:
 Kendriya Vidyalaya, Baripada
 Maharaja Krushna Chandra High School, Baripada
 Sri Sathya Sai Vidya Vihar English Medium School
 St Anne's Convent School, Baripada

Notable persons
 Jogesh Pati, Indian-American theoretical physicist at the University of Maryland, USA
 Jatin Das, international painter
 Bijay Mohanty, actor in Odia language films
 Uttam Mohanty, actor in Odia language films

References

Cities and towns in Mayurbhanj district